William Senter "Pedie" Jackson (October 19, 1898 – August 31, 1938) was an American football and basketball coach and college athletics administrator. He served as the head football coach at Concord College—now known as Concord University—in Athens, West Virginia from 1923 to 1926, Emory and Henry College in Emory, Virginia from 1927 to 1935, and King College—now known as King University—in Bristol, Tennessee from 1936 to 1937.

A native of Johnson City, Tennessee, Jackson played football, basketball, and baseball at Emory and Henry before graduating with an A.B. degree in 1920. He began his coaching career in 1921 at Alexander College—now known as Lon Morris College—a junior college in Jacksonville, Texas, leading his football team to a record of 5–1–2. The next year, he coached the football team at Virginia High School in Bristol, Virginia to a record of 7–0–1.

Jackson died of pneumonia, on August 31, 1938, at King Mountain Memorial Hospital in Bristol, Virginia.

Head coaching record

College football

Notes

References

External links
 

1898 births
1938 deaths
Concord Mountain Lions football coaches
Emory and Henry Wasps athletic directors
Emory and Henry Wasps baseball players
Emory and Henry Wasps football coaches
Emory and Henry Wasps football players
Emory and Henry Wasps men's basketball coaches
Emory and Henry Wasps men's basketball players
King Tornado football coaches
High school football coaches in Virginia
Junior college football coaches in the United States
People from Johnson City, Tennessee
Coaches of American football from Tennessee
Players of American football from Tennessee
Baseball players from Tennessee
Basketball players from Tennessee
Basketball coaches from Tennessee
Deaths from pneumonia in Virginia